Baljit Garhi  is a  village in Hasanpur Baru Gram Panchayat, Sadabad Tahsil in Hathras district of Uttar Pradesh state, India.

Villages in Hathras district